The Rough Guide to the Music of Brazil is a world music compilation album originally released in 1998. Part of the World Music Network Rough Guides series, the album spotlights the music of Brazil, with tracks representing genres from across the country. Phil Stanton, co-founder of the World Music Network, produced the album. This was the first of two similarly named albums: the second edition was released in 2007.

Critical reception

The album received mixed reviews. Writing for AllMusic, Alex Henderson named it one of the most ambitious collections of its type. What Henderson called "variety", Michaelangelo Matos of the Chicago Reader called "inconsistency". According to Matos, the album displayed "a wider stylistic range than any other I've heard", even amongst the Rough Guide releases.

Track listing

References 

1998 compilation albums
World Music Network Rough Guide albums